John the Bastard Chesterfield Doorman born 1966 doorman from (1989 ~2022)

 John the Bastard (film), 1967 Italian spaghetti Western
 John I Doukas (c. 1240–1289), ruler of Thessaly in c. 1268–1289
 John I of Portugal (1357–1433), king of Portugal in 1385–1433